Jakub Jáně (born 13 September 1990) is a Czech slalom canoeist who has competed at the international level since 2006.

He won three medals at the ICF Canoe Slalom World Championships with two golds (Mixed C2: 2019, C2 team: 2013) and a bronze (C2 team: 2014). He also won three silver and four bronze medals at the European Canoe Slalom Championships.

His partner in the men's C2 was Ondřej Karlovský.

Jáně won the overall World Cup title in mixed C2 in 2018 together with Tereza Fišerová. It was the first year when mixed C2 was included in the World Cup.

His older brother Michal is also a slalom canoeist.

World Cup individual podiums

References

External links

1990 births
Czech male canoeists
Living people
Medalists at the ICF Canoe Slalom World Championships
Sportspeople from Hradec Králové